Krzan may refer to:

 Krzan, Poland, a village near Kościan
 Kržan, Croatian surname